Gushalan (also Romanized as Gūshalān, Gooshlan, Gūshelān, and Gūshlān) is a village in Simineh Rud Rural District, in the Central District of Bahar County, Hamadan Province, Iran. At the 2006 census, its population was 277, in 59 families.

References 

Populated places in Bahar County